Kent C. Bloomer is an American sculptor, professor and author who is a well known proponent and creator of architectural ornament. He has taught classes on ornament at the Yale School of Architecture for over forty years, and many of his public works of ornament have become well known landmarks. He has written several books and articles on visual perception and architectural ornament, including the principal authorship, with Charles Moore, of “Body, Memory and Architecture,” 1977.

Biography

Education
Bloomer studied physics and architecture at MIT from 1953-1957, studying under György Kepes. He then  studied sculpture at Yale University from 1957–61, with Josef Albers and Erwin Hauer.   In a show of student work done under Albers, Art News described Bloomer’s work as “something of a stranger in this general company, both in terms of the interest that he assumes in metal textures and also in terms of the fact that his forms have anthropomorphic connotations."

Career
Bloomer was an instructor and assistant professor in architecture at Carnegie Tech (now Carnegie Mellon University) from 1961–66, where he taught first-year architecture students in the intensive Basic Design course.  Bloomer was also a frequent critic at the University of California at Los Angeles and the University of Texas at Austin.

In 1966, Bloomer was recruited to the Yale School of Architecture by Dean Charles Moore and appointed Assistant Professor of Architectural Design. Bloomer was also an integral player in the development of the Yale Building Project, working with Moore and students to design and build the critically praised New Zion Community Center in rural Kentucky.

At Yale, Bloomer served as Director of Undergraduate Studies in Architecture for seventeen years. In 1978, Bloomer began teaching “Ornament Theory and Design,” exploring the history and meaning of architectural ornament expressed in built work and writings throughout the history of architecture.  Through Bloomer's classes and publications, he has been influential in bringing ornament back into architecture. Bloomer remains a Professor on the faculty of architecture at Yale, teaching his ornament seminar and co-teaching the first-year Visualization requirement.

In 1981, Bloomer and lighting designer Gerald Allen designed new luminaires to sit atop Central Park’s 1910 Henry Bacon-designed lampposts.

Bloomer has maintained a professional practice since 1961, founding the Kent Bloomer Studio in 1982.

The studio's work began at a large scale with the installation of enormous aluminum "tree domes" within the WonderWall at the 1984 New Orleans World’s Fair, designed by Moore's firm MLTW.  Bloomer designed the exuberant acroterion on Thomas Beeby’s Harold Washington Library Center in Chicago, and the ornament for many other large public works, including the ornament of the Slover Library in Norfolk, Virginia, in 2014.

Select works
Temple Rodef Shalom, portal bas-relief, Pittsburgh, PA (completed 1965).
Central Park luminaires, New York City, with Gerald Allen Architect (completed 1982).
New Orleans World's Fair, "Tree Domes," New Orleans, LA, with Charles Moore Architect (completed 1984).
University of Oregon Science Complex, Willamette Hall, "Physics Wall," atrium and light standards, with The Ratcliff Architects;  Moore Ruble Yudell Architects; and  Brockmeyer McDonnell Architects (completed 1989).
Yale University, gothic luminaires (completed 1990).
Harold Washington Library Center, roof ornaments, Chicago, IL, with Thomas H. Beeby Architect (completed 1993).
Duke Ellington Circle and Central Park West Lightposts, New York City (completed 1997).	
Ronald Reagan National Airport window tracery, with Cesar Pelli, Architect (completed 1997).
Kansas State University, Hale Library, stone and metal ornaments and railings, with HBRA Architects and BBN Architects (completed 1997).
Rice University, Baker Hall, exterior and interior ornament, Houston, TX, with HBRA Architects (completed 1997).
Great Platte River Road Archway Monument, roof ornament and mural, Kearney, NE, with Peter Dominick, Architect (completed 2000).
Nashville Public Library, entrance frieze, Nashville, TN, with Robert A.M. Stern Architects (completed 2001).
Rice University, Jesse H. Jones Graduate School of Management, entrance ornament and sculpture, Houston, TX, with Robert A.M. Stern Architects (completed 2002).
Yale University, Class of 1954 Chemistry Research Building, entrance gate, New Haven, CT, with Bohlin Cywinski Jackson (completed 2005).
Yale University, Bass Library entrance pavilion and Sterling Memorial Library, stairwell entrance ornament, with HBRA Architects (completed 2007).
Yale University, Woolsey Hall, display cases (completed 2007). 
Yale University, University Theatre, display cases (completed 2009).
Clinton Avenue School, New Haven, CT, with Ken Boroson Architects (completed 2004).
Hill Central School, New Haven, CT, with Ken Boroson Architects (completed 2012).
360 State Street parking garage, façade design and ornaments, New Haven, CT, with Becker and Becker Associates (completed 2010).
New York Avenue Bridge, "Gateway Wings," Washington, D.C. (completed 2013).

Bibliography

Books
Body, Memory, and Architecture, Yale University Press, 1977, with Charles W. Moore
The Nature of Ornament, Rhythm and Metamorphosis in Architecture, W.W. Norton, 2000.
Mimetic Rivalry, Papadakis Press, 2012, with Rene Girard, Leon Krier, and Samir Younes

Select articles
Interiors, "Have You Heard of Haptic?" 1979
Perspecta 17, Yale School of Architecture, "The Personality of a Ruin" and "Alfombres de Asserin, 1980
Interiors, "Ornamentalism in Architecture" 1983
Perspecta 22, Yale School of Architecture, "Multiple Essences"	1986
Perspecta 23, Yale School of Architecture and Rizzoli, "Botanical Ornament: the Continuity and the Transformation of a Tradition" 1987
Inland Architect, "Spatial Language in Architecture" 1992
L'Architecture d’Aujourd'hui, Paris, "The Formation of Ornament"	, 2001
306090, vol. 10, "A Critical Distinction Between Decoration and Ornament" 2006

References

External links
 

Yale School of Art alumni
Sculptors from Connecticut
Yale School of Architecture faculty
1935 births
Living people
Writers from Mount Vernon, New York
Massachusetts Institute of Technology alumni
Carnegie Mellon University faculty